The 2014 Alabama gubernatorial election took place on November 4, 2014, to elect the governor of Alabama.

Incumbent Republican Governor Robert J. Bentley ran for re-election to a second term in office. He defeated Democratic former U.S. Representative Parker Griffith in the general election. However, Bentley only served out two years of his term; he resigned in April 2017 due to a scandal and was succeeded by Lieutenant Governor Kay Ivey.

As of 2022, this, along with the concurrent Senate election, is the last time Jefferson County has voted Republican in any statewide election.

Republican primary

Candidates

Declared
 Robert J. Bentley, incumbent Governor
 Stacy Lee George, former Morgan County Commissioner
 Bob Starkey, retired software company owner and candidate for Mayor of Scottsboro in 2012

Declined
 Tommy Battle, Mayor of Huntsville
 Bradley Byrne, U.S. Representative and candidate for Governor in 2010 (ran for re-election)
 David Carrington, President of the Jefferson County Commission (ran for re-election)
 Beth Chapman, former Secretary of State of Alabama
 Mike Hubbard, Speaker of the Alabama House of Representatives (ran for re-election)
 Mary Scott Hunter, Member of the Alabama State Board of Education (ran for re-election)
 Kay Ivey, Lieutenant Governor of Alabama (ran for re-election)
 Tim James, businessman, son of former Governor Fob James and candidate for Governor in 2002 and 2010
 Del Marsh, President Pro Tempore of the Alabama Senate (ran for re-election)
 Roy Moore, Chief Justice of the Alabama Supreme Court and candidate for Governor in 2006 and 2010
 Tony Petelos, Jefferson County Manager and former Mayor of Hoover
 Bob Riley, former governor of Alabama
 Luther Strange, Attorney General of Alabama (ran for re-election)

Polling

Results

Democratic primary

Candidates

Declared
 Kevin Bass, businessman, former professional baseball player and candidate for Mayor of Fayette in 2012
 Parker Griffith, former U.S. Representative

Declined
 Billy Beasley, state senator
 Regina Benjamin, former Surgeon General of the United States
 Sue Bell Cobb, former chief justice of the Alabama Supreme Court
 Vivian Davis Figures, Minority Leader of the Alabama Senate and nominee for the U.S. Senate in 2008
 Craig Ford, Minority Leader of the Alabama House of Representatives
 Pete Johnson, retired Jefferson County Judge
 John Rogers, state representative
 Robert Vance, Jefferson County Circuit Judge and nominee for Chief Justice of the Alabama Supreme Court in 2012

Results

Independents

Candidates

Declined
 Charles Barkley, former NBA player

General election

Predictions

Polling

Results

References

External links

Alabama gubernatorial election, 2014 at Ballotpedia

Official campaign websites (Archived)
 Robert Bentley for Governor incumbent
 Kevin Bass for Governor
 Parker Griffith for Governor

Gubernatorial
2014
Alabama